Chinner is an English surname shared by several notable people:

Hubert Chinner (1870–1953), South Australian cricketer
John Henry Chinner (1865–1933), South Australian caricaturist
Norman Chinner (1909–1961), South Australian organist and choirmaster, grandson of William
William Bowen Chinner (1850–1915), South Australian organist, choirmaster, teacher and composer

References